Plecoptera violacea is a species of moth of the family Erebidae first described by Pagenstecher in 1884. It is found from Sundaland east to New Guinea, New Caledonia and Fiji.

Larvae have been recorded on Erythrina, Pterocarpus, Senna, Pterocarpus, Randia, Psychotria, Tarenna and Phyllanthus.

References

External links 

Anobinae
Moths described in 1884